Horrall Glacier is a tributary glacier in the Kohler Range of Marie Byrd Land, Antarctica. It flows east-northeast from Faulkender Ridge to join Kohler Glacier at Klimov Bluff. The glacier was mapped by the United States Geological Survey from surveys and U.S. Navy air photos, 1959–65, and was named by the Advisory Committee on Antarctic Names for Thomas R. Horrall, a United States Antarctic Research Program and a University of Wisconsin glaciologist and engineer with the Marie Byrd Land Survey party, 1963–64 and aeromagnetic surveys in West Antarctica, 1965–66.

References

Glaciers of Marie Byrd Land